Stolzenau is a municipality in the district of Nienburg, in Lower Saxony, Germany. It is situated on the left bank of the Weser, approx. 20 km southwest of Nienburg, and 25 km northeast of Minden. During the second half of the 20th century, a unit of the Royal Netherlands Air Force was stationed in Stolzenau.

References

External links
 Stolzenau 

Nienburg (district)